This is a list of scientific laws named after people (eponymous laws). For other lists of eponyms, see eponym.

See also 
 Eponym
 Fields of science
 List of eponymous laws (overlaps with this list but includes non-scientific laws such as Murphy's law)
 List of legislation named for a person
 List of laws in science
 Lists of etymologies
 Scientific constants named after people
 Scientific phenomena named after people
 Stigler's law of eponymy

Further reading 
 

scientific laws named after people
Scientific laws
Lists of things named after scientists